Chaudhry Abid Ashraf Jotana (Urdu چوہدری عابد اشرف جوتانہ; born February 13, 1982, in Pind Dadan Khan Tehsil, Pakistan) is a Pakistani politician who has been a member of the Provincial Assembly of the Punjab since August 2002.

Personal life 
His Political Party is (MPA | PP-27) Provincial Assembly of the Punjab.

Political career 
Chaudhry Abid Jotana was elected to the Provincial Assembly of Punjab from the constituency Nazam Tehsil  in Pakistan Muslim League (Q) in the 2002 Pakistani by-elections. On the ticket of PML-Q he reiterated support to PAT 2018 Every step of government is against country and people, bringing a new flood of soaring prices: Ch Parvez Elahi PML-Q

Trustee

References 

Living people
1982 births
People from Pind Dadan Khan Tehsil
People from Pind Dadan Khan
People from Jhelum District
Pakistan People's Party MNAs
Punjabi people
Politicians from Punjab, Pakistan
Pakistan Tehreek-e-Insaf politicians
Chaudhary Abid
Politicians from Jhelum